Laputa [luh·poo·tuh] is a flying island described in the 1726 book Gulliver's Travels by Jonathan Swift. The island is the home of the king of Balnibarbi and his court, and is used by the king to enforce his rule over the lands below.

Location
Laputa was located above the realm of Balnibarbi, which was ruled by its king from the flying island. The position of the island, and the realm below, is some five days' journey south-south-east of Gulliver's last known position, 46° N, 183° E (i.e. east of Japan, south of the Aleutian Islands) down a chain of small rocky islands.

Description

In shape the upper surface sloped down from circumference to centre, causing all rain to form rivulets into the centre where four large basins  in circuit lie  from the absolute centre.   In the centre of the island itself was a chasm 50 yards in diameter continuing down into a dome extending  into the adamantine surface.  This dome served as an astronomical observatory, and also contained the lodestone which enabled the island to fly and move above the realm.

Inhabitants

Laputa's population consists mainly of an educated elite, who are fond of mathematics, astronomy, music and technology, but fail to make practical use of their knowledge. Servants make up the rest of the population.

The Laputans have mastered magnetic levitation. They also are very fond of astronomy, and discovered two moons of Mars. (This is 151 years earlier than the recognized discovery of the two moons of Mars by Asaph Hall in 1877.) However, they are unable to construct well-designed clothing or buildings, as they despise practical geometry as "vulgar and mechanick". The houses are ill-built, lacking any right angles, and the clothes of Laputans, which are decorated with astrological symbols and musical figures, do not fit, as they take measurements with instruments such as quadrants and a compass rather than with tape measures. They spend their time listening to the music of the spheres. They believe in astrology and worry constantly that the sun will go out.

Many of them have heads angled to one side, and they often suffer from strabismus: one eye turns inward and the other looks up "to the zenith", conditions that Swift uses to mock the microscope and the telescope.  Laputans are described as becoming so lost in thought that they cannot focus their attention on a conversation or avoid running into a tree or falling into a ditch unless periodically struck by a bladder full of pebbles or dry peas carried by one or two "flappers" or, in their native language, "climenoles", hired for the purpose. 

Laputa is a male-dominated society. Wives often request to leave the island to visit the land below; however, these requests are almost never granted because the women who leave Laputa never want to return.
The Laputan women are highly sexed (having "an abundance of vivacity") and adulterous, and, whenever possible, take on lovers out of visitors from the lands below. The Laputan husbands, who are so abstracted in mathematical and musical calculations, might assume their wives are adulterous, but so long as they have no flapper around, they won't notice the adultery even should it occur right before their eyes.

Nearby lands
The land beneath the floating island, within the region the Laputa can travel, is known as Balnibarbi. Balnibarbi is controlled by the king of Laputa; its ground capital is the city of Lagado.

Laputa's king is able to control the mainland mostly by threatening to cover rebel regions with the island's shadow, thus blocking sunlight and rain, or by throwing rocks at rebellious surface cities. In extreme cases, the island is lowered onto the cities below to crush them, although this is not successful every time, notably in the case of Lindalino.

The Balnibarbian language, spoken on both Laputa and Balnibarbi, is described by Gulliver as sounding similar to Italian.

Symbolism
Lindalino's rebellion against Laputa is an allegory of Ireland's revolt against Great Britain, and Great Britain's (meaning the Whig government's) violent foreign and internal politics (see Jonathan Swift for his political career). The Laputans' absurd inventions mock the Royal Society.

As "la puta" means "the whore" in Spanish, some Spanish editions of "Gulliver's Travels" use "Lapuntu", "Laput", "Lapuda" and "Lupata" as bowdlerisations. It is likely, given Swift's education and satirical style, that he was aware of the Spanish meaning. (Gulliver claimed Spanish among the many languages in which he was fluent.)

Legacy

On Mars's largest moon, Phobos, there is a feature named regio, Laputa Regio, which is named after Swift's Laputa because of his 'prediction' of the two then undiscovered Martian moons, which his Laputan astronomers had discovered.

The 1986 Japanese animated fantasy film, Laputa: Castle in the Sky, directed by Hayao Miyazaki, derives its name and basic premise from Swift's novel.

Explanatory notes

Citations

General sources
 
  First published 1726.

External links

 Gulliver's Travels, by Jonathan Swift at Project Gutenberg

Fictional elements introduced in 1726
Fictional Asian countries
Fictional city-states
Fictional islands
Gulliver's Travels locations
Magnetic levitation
Fictional aircraft
Fictional floating islands